Vitalité Health Network is one of two health authorities in the Canadian province of New Brunswick, the other being Horizon Health Network.

Vitalité Health Network delivers medical care on behalf of the Government of New Brunswick's Department of Health to the northern and southeastern portions of the province through 11 hospitals and 30 health centres/clinics and provides a variety of programs and services.

Vitalité Health Network is headquartered in Bathurst, New Brunswick.

Hospitals
Vitalité Health Network operates the following hospitals:

 Dr. Georges-L.-Dumont University Hospital Centre (Moncton, NB)
 Chaleur Regional Hospital (Bathurst, NB)
 Hôpital de l'Enfant-Jésus (Caraquet, NB)
 Tracadie-Sheila Hospital (Tracadie–Sheila, NB)
 Campbellton Regional Hospital (Campbellton, NB)
 Restigouche Hospital Centre (Campbellton, NB)
 St. Joseph Community Health Centre (Dalhousie, NB)
 Edmundston Regional Hospital (Edmundston, NB)
 Grand Falls General Hospital (Grand Falls, NB)
 Hôtel-Dieu Saint-Joseph de Saint-Quentin (Saint-Quentin, NB)
 Stella-Maris-De-Kent Hospital (Sainte-Anne-de-Kent, NB)

Former health authorities
Vitalité Health Network was established by the provincial government effective September 1, 2008 through the dissolution and merger of the following health authorities:

 Beauséjour Regional Health Authority
 Acadie-Bathurst Health Authority
 Restigouche Health Authority
 Regional Health Authority 4

Quick facts
 Vitalité Health serves the province of New Brunswick but through inter-provincial and international agreements, also provides referral services for part of northeastern Maine (Aroostook County) as well as Quebec's Gaspé Peninsula (through hospitals in Edmundston and Campbellton)
 One of the largest employers in New Brunswick
 Annual budget approximately $660 million
 Approximately 7,600 staff members and 470 physicians
 Over 70 facilities, clinics and offices
 1,200 volunteers, auxiliary and alumnae members
 9 foundations

Statistics (2013 - 2014)

Number of:

 beds 1,197
 patient days 387,476
 surgeries 20,798
 emergency room visits 249,041
 births 1,780
 Extra-Mural Program visits 182, 638

References

External links
 Vitalité Health Network - web site

Bathurst, New Brunswick
Health regions of New Brunswick
Crown corporations of New Brunswick